Wilton is a town of the Macarthur Region of New South Wales, Australia in the Wollondilly Shire. It is located around 80 km south west of Sydney CBD, within close proximity of Cataract Dam. It is an exurb of Greater Sydney under development, which includes the new estate of Bingara Gorge.

History
After a process that had its origins in the 1970s an intergovernmental group suggested in 1986 that Wilton and Badgerys Creek were preferred sites for a potential second airport of Sydney in the Sydney Basin. The federal government under Bob Hawke selected Badgerys Creek.  In April 2012 the then federal Minister for Transport, Anthony Albanese and Qantas CEO Alan Joyce endorsed the suitability of Wilton as a location for a potential second airport of Sydney. On 8 May 2012, with the site selection process still stalled, Anthony Albanese announced further investigations into the Wilton site. The NSW Premier Barry O'Farrell opposed the use of Wilton as an airport. In April 2014 Prime Minister Tony Abbott confirmed approval for the location of Sydney's second airport at Badgerys Creek.

As early as in the 2000s, Lendlease began the development of Bingara Gorge in Wilton. As of early 2023, Wilton has an estimated population of 5,000; its urban planning is divided among four developers, each having signed a Voluntary Planning Agreement to provide infrastructure "at no cost to government". It is expected to grow into a region with a population of 55,000 by 2040.

Amenities 
As an exurb under development, Wilton has limited amenities available to its residents. Apart from a primary school, it has a take away, which includes pizza, and opposite thereof is a Shell service station. The Bingara Gorge development includes a Domino's pizza shop, an IGA store, a medical centre & pharmacy, a liquor store, 2 cafes and a Chinese restaurant.

Wilton is just located off Picton Road which diverges off the Hume Highway to Wollongong. With no public transport available, its residents are totally dependent on their family cars for commuting.

Heritage listings 
Wilton has a number of heritage-listed sites, including:
 Wilton Park Road: Wilton Park

Sport
Hannaford Oval is home to Wollondilly Redbacks Junior Australian Football Club & Wollondilly Knights Senior Australian Football Club along with Wollondilly White Waratahs Rugby Union Club in the winter. In the summer the oval is used by Camden District Cricket Association.
Wilton is home to the Sydney Skydivers.

References

External links

Hume Highway
Wollondilly Shire